Homoeotricha longipennis is a species of tephritid or fruit flies in the genus Homoeotricha of the family Tephritidae.

Distribution
Korea, East Russia, Japan.

References

Tephritinae
Insects described in 1933
Diptera of Asia